This article lists Marvel characters beginning with the letter "H", with a brief description introducing each one.

Hala the Accuser

Gabrielle Haller
Gabrielle Haller was a catatonic Holocaust survivor who awoke from the disorder after Charles Xavier used his powers to make her aware again. Gabby and Charles fell in love while he saw to her recovery for weeks, with the help of hospital volunteer and their mutual friend, Magnus (the future Magneto). When she is kidnapped by terrorist organization HYDRA, led by the Nazi Baron Strucker, Charles and Magnus used their mutant powers to save her and defeat HYDRA. Immediately afterwards, Magnus left Gabby and Charles feeling that her and Charles' view on mutants and humans contrasted his own. Magnus left with Nazi gold HYDRA wanted to claim.

Over some time, the two amicably ended their relationship. Soon after, Charles leaves Israel unaware that Gabrielle was pregnant. Years later, Gabrielle became the Israeli ambassador to Great Britain living in Paris with her young son David. During a terrorist attack at her home claiming the life of David's godfather Daniel Shomron, David's mutant powers activated, ending with him killing the terrorists and putting himself in a catatonic state. Later, David (who is now in his late teens) developed a disease the comic inaccurately describes as autism, which concerns his mother, who thinks it's a symptom of something more serious. Gabrielle did everything she could, but she turned to Dr. Moira MacTaggert for help. She tells Moira that Xavier is David's father and that she doesn't want him involved. Unfortunately, David's powers began to manifest uncontrollably, absorbing the psyches of two of MacTaggert's friends, Tom Corsi and Sharon Friedlander. Moira had no choice but to call Xavier to help who is assisted by some of the New Mutants. When David absorbs Moira's and Wolfsbane's psyches into his mind, Xavier and Dani used their powers to enter it as well. It is here that Xavier discovers he's David's father. Gabrielle and Cypher are also absorbed and they all meet David's various personalities, including that of the absorbed psyche of the terrorist leader who raided his home. Eventually, Dani and David's personalities returned everybody to their bodies, fixing most of David's mind and ridding him of his disorder. Despite her secrecy, Xavier does his best to help raise David.

Later, Gabrielle becomes Magneto's attorney, who is on trial for crimes against humanity. The trial was halted when Baron Strucker's mutant twin children, collectively named Fenris, attacked the proceedings seeking revenge against her, Xavier and Magneto for their father's death. After Xavier and Magneto defeated them, Magneto did not return to the courtroom.

Gabrielle loses David because of Bishop from an alternate timeline known as the Age of Apocalypse after he created said timeline when he accidentally kills his father. Bishop in the AoA timeline prevents this from happening by killing David.

Deeply saddened by the loss of her son, Gabrielle eventually moved on with her life. She continued work as the Israeli ambassador. She, along with the mutant hero Sabra, attempted to find out Magneto's true identity, but failed after he killed the forger Georg Odekirk who gave him the "Erik Magnus Lehnsherr" name. Gabrielle was also part of the United Nations decision to give the island nation of Genosha to Magneto, after he demanded an entire mutants-only nation.

Gabrielle opposed the formation of the Mutant Response Division that was proposed by Stephen Lang and Bolivar Trask. The group formed anyway.

Pete Wisdom later called Gabrielle to have a talk with Legion after he caused trouble across Great Britain. Following the coordinates in the car that was sent to pick up Legion, Gabrielle tracked the coordinates to Muir Island. After Gabrielle and Legion talked about what transpired in the "Age of X" reality, Gabrielle is accidentally shot by an Aqiri superhero whose president holds a personal grudge against Legion. As Gabrielle started bleeding, she told her son not to search his mind for a personality that has healing powers. Before passing away, Gabrielle told Legion that there haven't been any miracles from coming back from the dead. Infuriated with his mother's death, Legion incinerated his attackers and then teleported to the Jean Grey School for Higher Learning.

Gabrielle was later resurrected by Legion alongside Abigail Brand, Chamber, Karasu-Tengu, and Sojobo Tengu.

Gabrielle Haller in other media
Gabrielle Haller appears in X-Men: Evolution, voiced by Patricia Drake. This version is shown as too young to be a Holocaust survivor (though her comic appearances are also inconsistent on this matter). In the episode "Sins of the Son", Gabrielle is the mother to David who hid the truth of Professor X's existence. Though in this version they were married briefly when they were young, divorcing when Xavier's work with mutants kept them apart. Gabrielle tells David that Xavier abandons them. Gabrielle later calls Professor X when David goes missing. She later discovers that David was taken over by the Lucas personality that has personal issues with his father.

Gabrielle Haller appears in Legion, portrayed by Stephanie Corneliussen. As in the comics, she was originally in a catatonic state at a mental hospital following her time in concentration camps during World War II until Professor X used his telepathy to revive her psyche. In "Chapter 22", Gabrielle and Professor X were in the mental hospital until Professor X used his mental abilities to have the doctors deem them cured. The two of them settled in a home where they gave birth to David. When Professor X went to Morocco, Gabrielle got a call from him stating that Shadow King is dangerous. Shadow King secretly possessed baby David which is witnessed by an adult David and Switch. In "Chapter 26", Syd Barrett, Cary Loudermilk, and Kerry Loudermilk arrived in the year of David's infancy where Syd interacted with Gabrielle. During their talk about David, the house is attacked by the Time Eaters where Syd killed the one that tried to attack baby David. Gabrielle then comforted baby David as Syd states that they need to get out of the house.

Tadashi Hamada

Cockroach Hamilton

Hamir the Hermit

Hamir the Hermit is a sorcerer, created by Stan Lee and Steve Ditko, who first appeared in Strange Tales #111.

Hamir was the descendant of Kan, who started the tradition of assisting sorcerers who used their magic for good. Hamir brought his son Wong to meet the Ancient One, becoming one of his disciples in the process. Hamir was constantly outdone by evil sorcerers such as Baron Mordo and Kaecilius whenever they came for the Ancient One, nonetheless he continued to serve his master in sickness and in health. When the Ancient One passed away, Hamir stayed at the temple and continued to train newer students.

Hamir the Hermit in other media
Hamir appears in the Marvel Cinematic Universe films Doctor Strange and  Doctor Strange in the Multiverse of Madness, portrayed by Topo Wresniwiro. This version is one of the Ancient One's many students, is missing his left hand, and does not appear to be related to Wong in any form.

Hammer

Boris Lubov
Boris Lubov is a Russian villain who often fights Maverick/Agent Zero. Debut was in Maverick #1 (September, 1997), created by Jorge Gonzalez & Jim Cheung.

Eisenhower Canty
Hammer was an ally to the mutant Cable and a member of the Six Pack. In another version, described as Ultimate Eisenhower Canty, Canty appears as a member of the Six Pack. Debut  was in Cable: Blood and Metal #1 (April 1990); created by Fabian Nicieza and John Romita, Jr.

Caleb Hammer

Caleb Hammer is an Old West Pinkerton detective who debuted in Marvel Premiere 54.

Hammer was one of the characters featured in Blaze of Glory, where he chases after Kid Colt, later teaming with him and other Western heroes to defend the town of Wonderment, Montana. During the battle the bounty hunter Gunhawk shoots Kid Colt in the back despite agreeing to put aside his chase of the Kid to defend Wonderment. Hammer strongly objects to this turn of events and ends up killing Gunhawk.

A flashback in X-Force #37 features an External named Absalom shooting an elderly Hammer in the back after Caleb refuses to participate in a duel with him.

Justin Hammer

Sasha Hammer

Sasha Hammer is a character appearing in American comic books published by Marvel Comics. She first appeared in The Invincible Iron Man #1 (July 2008), and was created by Matt Fraction and Salvador Larroca.

She is the daughter of Justine Hammer and the Mandarin, a relative of Justin Hammer and Temugin, and an enemy of Iron Man. Raised by her mother, they both harbor a desire for revenge against Tony Stark for Justin's loss, and see Stark as an obstacle to their success. She first appeared as the girlfriend/assistant to tech-terrorist Ezekiel "Zeke" Stane, providing support to Zeke's attacks on Stark Industries buildings around the world. When Zeke is apprehended by Iron Man and S.H.I.E.L.D., Sasha is able to go underground, having never been discovered.

Following Norman Osborn's fall from power, Hammer reappears out in the open alongside Justine as Hammer Industries' heads and purchases numerous de-commissioned H.A.M.M.E.R. technologies to create a large suit of powered armor that they wish to market globally for new generation of soldiers. Justine and Sasha embark on a campaign to discredit Iron Man in the industrial market, conspiring with the corrupt Pentagon general Babbage and staging civilian attacks in which Lt. Doug Johnson is arranged to intervene before Iron Man. When confronted about her operations, Sasha attacks with her own biotech weapons with which Zeke augmented her body before being arrested, revealing her criminal intent to both Iron Man and Rescue. Shortly after, the Steelcorps launches a surprise attack on Stark Resilient by orchestrating a remote-server air-strike unwittingly piloted by young gamers on phones-unaware these actions were actually taking place in the real world. The combined efforts of Iron Man, War Machine, Rescue and Maria Hill are able to stop the strike and shut down the Steelcorps. When the Hammers use their connections to arrange Zeke's secret release, Sasha introduces Zeke to her father's employ.

After Johnson is turned into stone by the Asgardian demon Mokk: Breaker of Faith and believed dead, Sasha is the Detroit Steel armor's new pilot by Justine. However, Johnson is later revealed to be alive and kidnaps his replacement. Johnson brings Sasha bound and gagged to Justine, threatening to kill her unless the Detroit Steel armor is returned. Johnson releases Hammer after regaining the Detroit Steel suit's possession. Sasha and the Steelcorps battle Johnson, resulting in Sasha killing Johnson with her whips.

Sasha and her Detroit Steel armor are next seen in Black Panther #171 (May 2018), the twelfth and penultimate part of writer Ta-Nehisi Coates's "Avengers of the New World" storyline. In the story, Sasha and her boyfriend, who had been previously believed killed in "The Five Nightmares" storyline in The Invincible Iron Man in which both characters first appeared, are in the African nation of Wakanda, where they are allied with the villain Klaw against Black Panther. The latter's forces dispatch Sasha and Ezekiel before defeating Klaw.

Sasha Hammer's powers and abilities
Sasha Hammer has been augmented by advanced technology, enabling her body to generate powerful energy of an unspecified type. She can project this energy from her hands in the form of whips and swords that she can use in physical combat. Her enhancements also give her ability to fly. These abilities' limits have not been explicitly given, but she can use them to destroy an automobile and can prove a considerable opponent to Iron Man.

When operating the Detroit Steel suits, she has at her disposal that full range of armaments and other features with which the Detroit Steel suits were designed, as well as modifications with which can be customized to a particular pilot. According to Hammer Industries, the Detroit Steel suit incorporates technology, such as C.N.S. (Controlled Exo-Enhanciles), that would eventually be used to end paralysis caused by cervical, thoracic or corticospinal injuries. Weighing four and a half tons, the "oversized" Detroit Steel towers over Iron Man, at approximately twice her opponent's height. The suit affords its occupant considerable protection from automatic weapons and explosives, though the magically-powered Mokk was able to easily rip open the armor.

The Detroit Steel suit allows its users to fly (though Sasha has this aforementioned ability without one), and usually is seen with a rotary cannon mounted on its right arm, and a specialized chainsaw on its left, which can penetrate Iron Man's Bleeding Edge Armor. There are rocket-powered munitions on the Detroit Steel suit's shoulders. The rotary cannon can be dismounted so that the soldier can carry and fire it as a traditional handheld weapon, and the Detroit Steel armor users have been seen outfitted with other types of weapons in this manner, including both directed-energy weapons and scaled-up rifles. Sasha's Detroit Steel armor has also been observed to have a directed-energy weapon in palm of its hands. Those who pilot the Detroit Steel armor are required to undergo considerable surgical modifications, which leave implants visible on the pilot's chest, which Lt. Johnson (who first piloted the Mark One) felt "turned [Johnson] into a monster", though Hammer (who already had undergone a number of enhancements by Zeke) regards herself as Stane's "masterpiece". As an executive of Hammer Industries, she has access to a wide range of armors that come in varying sizes and designs, with different models designed for different environments and hot zones, including arctic climates and urban encounters.

Sasha Hammer in other media
 Sasha Hammer appears in the anime film Iron Man: Rise of Technovore, voiced by Houko Kuwashima in the original Japanese and by Tara Platt in the English dub.
 The 2021 film Shang-Chi and the Legend of the Ten Rings features the character Xu Xialing (played by Meng'er Zhang), an amalgam of various characters including Sasha Hammer along with Zheng Bao Yu and Sister Dagger.

Hammerhead

Victoria Hand

Hangman

Harlan Krueger
Harlan Krueger was created by Marv Wolfman and Gil Kane and first appeared in Werewolf by Night #11.

After being court-martialed from the army for torturing prisoners of war, Krueger resolved to take the law into his own hands and became the masked vigilante the Hangman. His modus operandi involves executing male criminals while leaving female ones alive but imprisoned to 'protect them' from corruption (many died of starvation while in captivity). After years of stalking criminals with a noose and scythe, he comes into conflict with the Werewolf.

The Hangman next stalks one of the Brothers Grimm, who had been stealing from diamond merchants. Mistaking one Brother Grimm (Jake) for his target (William), he pursued him to a pyrotechnics building and saw him seemingly die in an explosion. He was later one of the superhumans captured by the Locksmith and Tick-Tock.

The Hangman later kills a disguised woman, thus inadvertently violating his own moral code. As he knelt over the corpse in remorse, he was fatally stabbed by film reviewer Matthew O'Brien, who had been trying to stop the Hangman from his latest killing spree, impaling the Hangman through the back and chest with his own scythe.

Jason Roland
Roland was created by Roy Thomas and Barry Smith, and first appeared in Tower of Shadows #5. He was an actor who made a deal with the demon Satannish) to make his career successful, but was instead trapped in a monstrous form. He fought with the West Coast Avengers on several occasions.

As the Hangman, he possesses magically enhanced strength and durability; indeed, he has gone head-to-head with Wonder Man. His rope is also magically enhanced, making it virtually indestructible. He can also levitate his rope and climb it without it being attached to anything. He is in almost constant communication with Satannish, who can enhance his powers as needed.

Maya Hansen

Hardball

HardDrive

Hardshell

Felicity Hardy

Hargen the Measurer

Quincy Harker
Quincy Harker is a character in the Marvel Universe based on a character in Bram Stoker's novel Dracula. He first appeared in Tomb of Dracula #7-8 (March, May 1973), and was adapted by Marv Wolfman and Gene Colan.

Quincy is the son of Jonathan and Mina Harker, two of the major characters in Stoker's novel. He was trained as a vampire hunter by Abraham Van Helsing, becoming his successor. In retaliation, Dracula causes Quincy's wife Elizabeth to commit suicide (out of her fear of him) and cripples Quincy, requiring him to use a wheelchair. Despite this, Quincy continues the fight, converting his house into a veritable vampire deathtrap and his wheelchair into a personal anti-vampire arsenal.

When Abraham Van Helsing's granddaughter Rachel was still a child, Dracula slew her parents before her eyes. Quincy then took her under his protection and trained her to become a vampire hunter as well. Quincy employed a number of other agents, including Taj Nital and Dracula's last mortal descendant Frank Drake, and formed alliances with Blade the Vampire Slayer and the detective-turned-vampire Hannibal King.

Ultimately, Quincy confronted Dracula alone at Castle Dracula itself in Transylvania. Knowing that he would die soon, as he had recently suffered a heart attack, he activated a time bomb in his wheelchair. Quincy plunged a silver wheelchair spoke into Dracula's heart and was about to sever the vampire's head when the explosives went off, killing Quincy and destroying the castle. However, Dracula was ultimately resurrected and the castle was rebuilt.

Quincy left a last will and testament to turn his remains into a safeguard against vampires for the United Kingdom, ensuring all vampires needed to be invited to enter the country. Dracula apparently destroyed said remains, but it is revealed that MI:13 tricked him into destroying fake ones.

Agatha Harkness

Harold H. Harold
Harold H. Harold is a character in the Marvel Universe. He first appeared in Tomb of Dracula #37 (October 1975), and was created by Marv Wolfman and Gene Colan. Harold is a writer for the magazine True Vampire Stories who happens upon an injured and unconscious Dracula, and steals blood to revive him so he can get an interview.

Harold goes on to aid Quincy Harker's team of vampire hunters against Dracula on numerous occasions. This inspires him to write a novel, The Vampire Conspiracy, which is later adapted into a motion picture.

Harold tracks Dracula to Cleveland and finds him impaled by a wooden fence post courtesy of Howard the Duck. The vampire persuades Harold to free him, then bites him and turns him into a vampire. Despite this turn of events, Harold goes on to become a successful Hollywood movie and television producer.

Like all other vampires on Earth, Harold H. Harold is eventually destroyed when Doctor Strange casts the vampire removal spell.

Harpoon

Harriet

Stephanie Harrington

Arthur Harrow

Arthur Harrow is a character appearing in American comic books published by Marvel Comics. He is a scientist who has trigeminal neuralgia that placed the left part of his lips into a permanent snarl.

Arthur Harrow in other media
Arthur Harrow appears in Moon Knight, portrayed by Ethan Hawke. This version is a cult leader with no neuralgia who is a former avatar of Khonshu and current avatar of Ammit.

Jonas Harrow

Danika Hart
Danika Hart is a character appearing in American comic books published by Marvel Comics. She is a blogger who attends New York University and vlogs on YouTube.

When Miles Morales's Spider-Man costume was damaged during a fight with Blackheart, she uploads a video on YouTube that states that the second Spider-Man is a "kid of color" much to the dismay of Miles who was shown the video by Ganke Lee.

When Spider-Man II disappeared, Ganke convinced Danika to publish a video asking it's viewers if they have heard anything about Spider-Man which she reluctantly did.

Danika continued to hang out with Ganke where they started dating. To avoid her deducing his connections with Spider-Man, Ganke asked her to call him by his alias of "Ned".

Ganke accidentally blurted out Miles name. Danika started to look into seeing how much she can make when selling the identity of a superhero. However, she dropped the idea due to the fact that she was in love with Ganke where a letter to her revealed that he is in love with her.

Danika Hart in other media
Danika Hart appears in the video game Spider-Man: Miles Morales, voiced by Ashly Burch. This version is the host of a podcast called "The Danikast", which covers various activities in New York, and clashes with fellow podcaster and former editor-in-chief of the Daily Bugle J. Jonah Jameson over their opinions on the original Spider-Man and the new Spider-Man.

Hate-Monger

Adolf Hitler clone

National Force

Edmund Heidler

Josh Glenn

Hauptmann Deutschland (Captain Germany)

Haven

Haven (Radha Dastoor) is a mutant character, created by J.M. DeMatteis and Greg Luzniak, who first appeared in X-Factor #96. She was the best-selling author of a book about the new humanity that would result from humans and mutants evolving into one race. She planned to bring this 'new humanity' about by destroying three quarters of the world in a Mahapralaya, or 'Great Destruction', as foretold in her Hindu teachings.

X-Factor opposes her, but she is able to sway Wolfsbane by curing her of the genetic engineering that had turned her into a mindless Genoshan mutate, allowing her to once again assume human form. X-Factor shuts down her entire operation with the help of her brother Monsoon. She attempts to cure Jamie Madrox (not the original, although no one knows that) from the Legacy Virus, but she fails and he dies, leaving X-Factor to believe the original Madrox is dead.

Haven herself has no powers, but is carrying a mutant fetus, with various abilities ranging from healing to telepathy to opening dimensional portals into personal pocket dimensions. The fetus acts through Haven, leaving the true nature of the situation unknown to the general populus. The fetus was the product of an old affair that never came to term, instead remaining a sentient embryo. Haven's efforts to cause destruction attract the attention of the Adversary, who uses her fetus to return himself to the world, consuming Haven in the process.

Havok

Hawkeye

Clint Barton

Kate Bishop

Pamela Hawley

Pamela Hawley is a character in the Marvel Comics universe. The character, created by Stan Lee and Jack Kirby, first appeared in Sgt. Fury and his Howling Commandos #4 (November 1963).

Hawley was a Red Cross medic who helped soldiers during World War II. Nick Fury meets her, falling in love with her because of her determined and "stubborn" attitude, but not thinking she would return these feelings. Her father Lord Hawley asked Fury to search for her brother Percy Hawley after being kidnapped by Nazis. Unfortunately, Percy was a Nazi sympathizer and Fury was forced to kill the man. To keep her from grief, Fury told Hawley that Percy died a hero. Hawley would go on to date Fury who, despite getting ridiculed and poked fun at by the Howling Commandos, ensured that she was loved. Despite Fury's overall character, Hawley considered Fury a "gentleman".

At one point, the time-displaced Morgana Blessing and Doctor Strange arrive, with the former discovering that she is Hawley's spiritual descendant. Along with Fury and Dum Dum Dugan, they battle Baron Mordo's minion, Sir Baskerville, using the power of Fury and Hawley's love. Doctor Strange then erases everyone's memories of the event.

Fury planned on proposing to Hawley, but discovers through her father that she died in an air raid, her last words being "Tell my wonderful American sergeant how much I love him..."

Pamela Hawley in other media
A character named Councilwoman Hawley appears in live-action films set in the Marvel Cinematic Universe, portrayed by Jenny Agutter. This version is a member of the World Security Council who oversees S.H.I.E.L.D. as one of Nick Fury's superiors.
 She first appears in the 2012 film The Avengers, wherein she wants to use the Tesseract's power for weapons rather than approve the Avengers initiative, and later agrees to launch a nuke at New York City during the Chitauri invasion.
 Hawley next appears in the 2014 film Captain America: The Winter Soldier to approve Project Insight, unaware that it was part of a HYDRA plot. She was later impersonated by Natasha Romanoff.

Gene and Alice Hayes

Haywire

Hazmat

Hazmat (Jennifer Takeda) first appeared in Avengers Academy #1 (June 2010); she was a series regular through its final issue. Created by Christos Gage and Mike McKone, the character Takeda discovers that her body naturally generates radiation when her boyfriend goes into a seizure while making out with her, an event that leads her family to all but abandon her, said boyfriend to dump her, and Takeda to have to wear a containment suit on a regular basis. Norman Osborn offers to cure her, but is just exploiting her.

During the Heroic Age storyline, Hazmat is recruited into the Avengers Academy, along with five other students affected by Osborn. The group is led to believe that they are among those most likely to become heroes, but quickly uncover files stating they are in fact most likely to become villains. Hazmat later enters a romantic relationship with Mettle, one of the only people who can physically touch her. Desiring normal lives, the two consume a substance that removes their powers; but later take an antidote to regain them to fight the substance's villainous creator, and then proceed to consummate their relationship.

As part of the Marvel NOW!, in Avengers Arena Hazmat, Reptil, Mettle, X-23, and a dozen others are kidnapped by Arcade. Arcade takes them to Murderworld, where Hazmat watches Mettle die to save her. She later becomes injured and begins to lose control over her radiation. The resulting explosion leads to complete control of her radiation so that she no longer has to wear her containment suit.

When Cammi and Anachronism reveal Bloodstone has gone missing, everyone heads to Bagalia to find him. Once they do, he reveals that he enjoys life among the villains, and the others, minus Cammi, start to enjoy it as well. When Cammi tries to tell the others to leave, Bloodstone instead has Daimon Hellstrom teleport the group to Arcade's latest party so they can kill him, which Hazmat does, blowing him to bits with a concentrated radiation burst. The group is invited to join with Baron Zemo. Hazmat, along with Anachronism and Cammi, are brought to be trained by Madame Masque, and the team plans to infiltrate the Masters of Evil and destroy them from within. Over the next few months, Hazmat and Anachronism grow close, eventually kissing. Hazmat contacts Hank Pym and informs him of the plans that the team has uncovered. She also tries to contact Death Locket, but later learns that Death Locket has betrayed the group and put Chase in a coma. She bests Death Locket and the Young Masters.

During the "Empyre" storyline, Hazmat is recruited to Captain Marvel's personal Accuser Corps and receives a copy of the Universal Weapon that was made by Doctor Strange.

Hazmat constantly emits harmful radiation, forcing her to wear a protective suit at all times when around others. The suit serves the additional purpose of enabling her to focus her radiation into energy bolts. Although her abilities manifested during her teens without obvious explanation, it has been confirmed that she is not a mutant.

Hazmat in other media
Hazmat appears as a playable character in Lego Marvel's Avengers.

Mark Hazzard

Headlok

Headsman

Hebe

Hecate

Hector

Heimdall

Hela

Helix

Hellcat

Hellcow

Helleyes
Helleyes is a extradimensional demon that debuted in Adventures into Fear #28 (June 1975) and conquered a "Hell" realm before targeting Earth.

Hellfire

Elementals

J.T. Slade

Hellion

Hellrazor

Daimon Hellstrom

Hemingway
Hemingway is a member of the team called Gene Nation. His first appearance was in Generation X #5. He is one of the few members to remain in all three incarnations of the team.

Fictional character biography 
When the mentally unstable Mikhail Rasputin flooded the Morlock tunnels, many were believed dead.  However, at the last instant Mikhail used his powers to open a portal into parallel dimension dubbed The Hill. In this dimension, time moves at a faster rate, and even though it was a manner of months in the main Marvel Universe, it had been between 10–20 years on the Hill.

On the anniversary of the Mutant Massacre, a horrific event in which Mr. Sinister's henchmen the Marauders killed many Morlocks, the members of Gene Nation reappeared in the main universe (Earth-616). Their mission was to destroy one hundred humans for every Morlock life that was lost, and also, in a side mission performed by Hemingway and Marrow, to kill some of the original Morlocks. In Marrow's eyes, Leech, one of the few to survive the massacre, was weak and instead of defending his people he hid like a coward. Fortunately, the White Queen, who was trying to recruit Leech to her teenage mutant team Generation X, was able to thwart their efforts. However, with the intervention of the Dark Beast, Marrow and Hemingway escaped.

Afterwards, a team of X-Men and the Morlock Callisto confronted an attack group from Gene Nation, which included Vessel, that was threatening the lives of several civilians by attaching incendiary devices to them that were regulated by Marrow's heartbeat. Seeing it as the only way of stopping the terrorist, Storm ripped out Marrow's heart. Defeated, Callisto took Vessel, along with the remaining members of Gene Nation, back to The Hill.

A few months later, Storm was kidnapped by Mikhail and taken to The Hill. Once there, she had to fight her way to the top of the hill where Mikhail lived, where she successfully overpowered him. Hemingway was one of the team that had successfully reached the top, yet he had decided to take on the moniker of "Pain". Having won the victory, Storm forced Mikhail to take all of the people living on The Hill back to the real world.  In an effort to give the mutants a new start, she settled them in a village outside of her home town in Africa.

However, they wouldn't get much of a chance to start over because shortly after they were placed in Africa the Dark Beast gathered some of the original members of Gene Nation, along with some new recruits, to form a new team. The express purpose of this team was to capture test subjects for the evil genius, namely the students of Generation X. Now returning to his former name, Hemingway, along with Vessel, were the only members of Gene Nation to be unsuccessful in their quarry, the newcomer Gaia. Along with the White Queen and Nate Grey, also known as X-Man, the three defeated the team.

Hemingway's final appearance was in the pages of Weapon X where he joined his old teammate Marrow, who was now leading Gene Nation, as her personal bodyguard. After manipulating the perfect killing machine Agent Zero into unintentionally killing his former sidekick, the assassin hunted down and killed every single member of Gene Nation in an act of vengeance, Hemingway being among the last. However, he spares the life of Marrow because he does not want others to see her as a martyr.

Necrosha 
Hemingway is among the dead mutants resurrected by the transmode virus that Selene sends to attack X-Force.

Powers and abilities 
Hemingway possesses an exoskeletal mutation that gives him razor-sharp bony protrusion from his back and arms that can be used for weapons. In addition to this he can greatly increase his size to immense proportions, augmenting his superhuman strength and durability in the process. His mutation seems to be one that is constantly evolving, as in The Uncanny X-Men #325 Callisto mentions that he seemed to be mutated further from when she last saw him. Now whether that is due to his mutation or to some added time on the Hill (whose timeline moves faster) remains to be seen. Another possibility is that it is the artists' renderings of him, which vary each time.

Hephaestus
Hephaestus first appeared in Thor #129 (June 1966), and was adapted from mythology by Stan Lee and Jack Kirby. He is the weaponmaker of the Olympian pantheon. He is not to be confused with the Eternal Phastos. Immortal and possessing superhuman physical attributes similar to those of the other Olympians, Hephaestus is a master weapons maker and inventor, able to make weapons which could kill even Hercules, but lacks the ability to project any form of energy, mystical or non-mystical. He made Hercules's mace, Ares' armor, and Zeus' chariot.

Hepzibah

Hera

Hera is a deity appearing in American comic books published by Marvel Comics. The character is based on the Greek Goddess of the same name. Hera first appeared in the pages of Thor #129, written by Stan Lee and drawn by Jack Kirby.

H.E.R.B.I.E.

Hercules

Gregory Herd

Hermes

Hermod

Hex

High Evolutionary

Hijack

Hijacker

Howard Mitchell

Unnamed

Hildegarde
Hildegarde was created by Gerry Conway and John Buscema, and first appeared in Thor #195 (January 1972). Hildegarde is one of the Valkyries. Odin sent Sif and Hildegarde to Blackworld. There, they came upon a town where people were fleeing in blind terror from Ego-Prime, which was created accidentally from Ego the Living Planet by Tana Nile. Sif and Hildegarde joined forces with Tana Nile, and escaped with her to Earth. Ego-Prime came to Earth, and the Asgardians battled him, and Odin sacrificed Ego-Prime to transform three people into Young Gods. The Asgardians, including Thor, Sif, and Hildegarde, were banished to Earth for a time for questioning Odin's actions during these events. Hildegarde accompanied Thor for a while before returning to Asgard.

Hildegund

Hildegund is a character in Marvel Comics. She was created by Stan Lee and Jack Kirby and first appeared in Journey into Mystery #120 (September 1965).

Hildegund, sometimes called Gudrun, is the wife of Volstagg of the Warriors Three. She is an excellent cook and it is because of this that her husband is large and fat, something that makes Hildegund and Volstagg very happy. Together the happy couple had ten sons (Alaric, Arngrim, Einar, Gunnar, Hrolf, Leif, Rolfe, Svein, Sigfod, Thakrad), four daughters (Flosi, Gudrun, Gunnhild, Jargsa) and numerous unnamed children. At some point, twins, Mick and Kevin Mortensen were orphaned when their mother, Ruby, was killed by Zaniac. Thor took the twins to Asgard where Volstagg and Hildegund lovingly accepted them with open arms. When Loki returned, albeit as a child, everyone in Asgard turned him away except for Volstagg and Hildegund, the latter feeling that he just needed motherly love and affection.

Hildegund in other media
Hildegund briefly appears in Thor: The Dark World played by Claire Brown. She has no dialogue and the credits simply list her as Volstagg's Wife. She is seen with Volstagg and three of their children celebrating one of their victories with Thor. Unlike her comic book counterpart, she is rather slim and not obese like her husband.

Maria Hill

Carol Hines
Carol Hines is a technician who works for the Weapon X project. When soldiers working for the Weapon X project brought in their captive Logan, Carol Hines reviewed the medical records of Logan. Carol Hines was present when the adamantium-bonding process was used on Logan where she was at the side of Professor Thorton and Abraham Cornelius. When he went berserk upon breaking free, Carol Hines was a witness to this as Logan slaughtered many soldiers and scientists while escaping.

At the time when Wolverine is planning to confront Professor Thorton, Carol Hines was present when Professor Thorton tells her that Wolverine is playing right into his hands. He tells Carol Hines that they are to book a flight to Canada immediately. When Wolverine enters a warehouse in Windsor, Ontario, Professor Thorton and Carol Hines watch alongside some HYDRA Agents. Then Professor Thortorn and Carol Hines enter a room to continue monitoring Wolverine as Professor Thorton activates the Shiva program. As Wolverine fights the Shiva robot, Carol Hines and Professor Thorton are attacked by Silver Fox who knocks out Carol Hines. When the X-Men catch up to where Professor Thorton was, they find Carol Hines with the Professor Thorton's dead body where she tells them that the Shiva robots have escaped the building chanting Sabretooth's name.

HYDRA later had Carol Hines in their clutches at the time when Wolverine and Wraith arrived at the HYDRA hover ship. Silver Fox has the HYDRA Agents torture the classified information of the Weapon X Program out of Carol Hines. Wolverine and Wraith don't agree with Carol Hines' torture and knock out the HYDRA Agents. After Mastodon liquifies in Jubilee's hands, Carol Hines states that it's the foreseen side effect of his age suppressor giving out. When Wolverine, Silver Fox, Wraith, and Maverick confront Aldo Ferro, Carol Hines tells Wolverine that Aldo Ferro is a "Psi-Borg". Aldo Ferro then mutates and kills Carol Hines by snapping her neck. When Maverick checks on Carol Hines, he finds that her neck-snapping was an illusion and that she died of fright at the sight of Aldo Ferro's Psi-Borg form.

Carol Hines in other media
Carol Hines appears in a flashback scene in the "Wolverine" segment of Hulk Vs. She is seen in a flashback working on the adamantium-bonding process on Logan.

Carol Hines appears in X2: Wolverine's Revenge, voiced by Jennifer Hale. She is seen as a Weapon X employee alongside Abraham Cornelius. Both of them are sent on their way when Logan confronts Professor Thorton. When Wolverine returns to the Weapon X facility to find the cure for the Shiva Strain Virus (which acts as a failsafe implanted in Weapon X test subjects), he manages to find Carol Hines and Abraham Cornelius at the Void (a maximum security detention center for mutant criminals similar to the Vault) where they end up giving Wolverine the Part A info for the Shiva Strain Virus cure.

Carol Hines appears in X-Men Origins: Wolverine played by Asher Keddie and it's video game adaptation of X-Men Origins: Wolverine voiced by Anna Graves, with her name given instead as Carol Frost.
Her role is greatly expanded in the game with several of her recordings can be found and listened to throughout the Weapon X facility. Sympathetic to Logan's plight, she helps restore his weakened healing factor and gives him back his clothes and personal items. In return, Logan saves a young mutant named Anna (whom Frost had been caring for) from being experimented on. Her fate afterwards is unknown.

Hindsight

Hippolyta

Hippolyta is an Amazon whose powers include superhuman strength, speed, durability, and flight, and immortality, amplified via Gauntlet of Ares which gives her the ability to increase her strength by 100 times.

Hiro-Kala

Hiroim

Hit-Monkey

Hitman

Burt Kenyon

Jimmy Pierce

Unnamed

Toni Ho

Anne Marie Hoag

Hobgoblin

Roderick Kingsley

Lefty Donovan

Ned Leeds

Jason Macendale

Daniel Kingsley

Phil Urich

Hobgoblin (Imperial Guard) 

Hobgoblin is a Chameloid shapeshifter who is a member of the Shi'ar Imperial Guard. Created by Chris Claremont and Dave Cockrum, the character first appeared in The X-Men #107 (October 1977). Like many original members of the Imperial Guard, Hobgoblin is the analog of a character from DC Comics' Legion of Super-Heroes: in his case Chameleon Boy.

Part of the division of the Imperial Guard known as the Superguardians, Hobgoblin is amongst the first of the Imperial Guard encountered by the team of superhuman mutant adventurers known as the X-Men who sought to rescue the Princess-Majestrix Lilandra Neramani from her insane brother, then-Majestor D'Ken. After the battle, Lilandra takes over as Majestrix, and the Guard swears allegiance to her. Some time later, the Guardsmen again come into conflict with the X-Men regarding Dark Phoenix, this time at the behest of Empress Lilandra.

Later, when Deathbird becomes Empress, she commands the entire Imperial Guard, including Hobgoblin, to fight the combined forces of the Starjammers and Excalibur on Earth so that she can claim the power of the Phoenix Force for herself. The Guard are forced to retreat when Deathbird is put in danger (and she realizes that Lilandra is leading the rebels). (Some time later War Skrulls impersonating Charles Xavier and the Starjammers depose Deathbird and restore Lilandra Neramani to the throne. Deathbird cedes the empire back to Lilandra as she has grown bored of the bureaucracy.)

In Operation: Galactic Storm, Hobgoblin masquerades as a crewman aboard a Shi'ar ship that has invaded Earth space, but is captured by the Avengers. He is taken to Project Pegasus, where his fellow Guardsman Warstar has also been incarcerated. Imperial Guardsmen Nightside and Scintilla break into Pegasus and free their teammates. Impersonating the Kree geneticist Doctor Minerva, Hobgoblin induces the Kree Captain Atlas to accompany him aboard a Shi’ar ship, where the Kree are outnumbered by the Imperial Guard, who then claim Captain Marvel's Nega-Bands for themselves.

Some years later, Ronan the Accuser leads the Kree in a surprise attack against the Shi'ar, using the Inhumans as an army to disrupt the Shi'ar control of the Kree. He forces the Inhumans and their king, Black Bolt, to obey, or he will destroy Attilan and everyone in it. He compels Karnak, Gorgon, and Triton to covertly join the Imperial Guard, while Black Bolt and Medusa attempt the assassination of the Shi'ar ruler Lilandra at a ceremony ratifying an alliance between the Shi'ar and the Spartoi. Hobgoblin poses as Lilandra, and is killed in her place.

Others

Hoder
Hoder first appeared in Thor #274-275 (August–September 1978), and was adapted from mythology by Roy Thomas and John Buscema. He is a totally blind, elder Asgardian god. At one point, Loki, God of Mischief, tricks Hoder into nearly killing Balder by shooting him with an arrow made of mistletoe wood (the only substance to which Balder is vulnerable). As well as possessing the superhuman abilities shared by all the Gods of Asgard, such as superhuman strength, Hoder can also receive visions of a far distant future or of events that will occur in other realities.

His dealings with Balder are detailed in the 'Trials of Loki' four part story.

Cameron Hodge

Happy Hogan

Jeryn Hogarth

Hogun

Holocaust

Lilly Hollister

Hollywood

H.O.M.E.R.

H.O.M.E.R. (short for Heuristically Operative Matrix Emulation Rostrum) is a character appearing in American comic books published by Marvel Comics. Created by Len Kaminski and Tom Tenney, H.O.M.E.R. first appeared in Iron Man #298 (November 1993). It is an artificial intelligence created by Tony Stark / Iron Man and Abe Zimmer for assistance within Stark Enterprises.

H.O.M.E.R. in other media
 H.O.M.E.R. appeared in Iron Man, voiced by Tom Kane.
 H.O.M.E.R. appeared in The Incredible Hulk episode "Helping Hand, Iron Fist", voiced again by Tom Kane.
 A similar character called J.O.E.Y. appears in Avengers Assemble, voiced by Roger Craig Smith. This version is an AI created by Scott Lang / Ant-Man as an assistant.

Honey Lemon

Hood

Hornet

Scotty McDowell

Peter Parker

Eddie McDonough

Phineas Horton
Professor Phineas Thomas Horton is a character appearing in American comic books published by Timely Comics, predecessor company of Marvel Comics. The character has been commonly depicted as the creator of the original Human Torch and stepfather of Frankie Raye. He first appeared in Marvel Comics #1. (September 1939) created by Carl Burgos.

Horus

Hoss
Hoss was created by writer Garth Ennis and artist Clayton Crain. He is a demon, an enemy and occasional ally of the Ghost Rider. Hoss has been described as "one of Hell's most able tracker-scouts". He first appeared in Ghost Rider (Road to Damnation) #1 (November 2005)

Howard the Duck

George Howe

Hrimhari

Heather Hudson

Jimmy Hudson

Hugin and Munin

Hulk

Bruce Banner

Rick Jones

Amadeus Cho

Hulk 2099

Hulk Robot

Military's Hulk Robot
The first Hulk Robot was a simulacrum created by the scientists at Gamma Base that was used to test the value of the Iceberg Rocket that General Thunderbolt Ross had his scientists create.

A later model of the Hulk Robot was operated by a remote that is worn by an individual at a safe distance. During the time he was cured of his gamma-radiation condition, Bruce Banner donned the harness to fight Leader during his takeover of Gamma Base. Although the Hulk Robot fought Leader's Murder Module, it was destroyed in battle where the feedback nearly killed Bruce Banner.

Another version of the military's Hulk Robot came into the possession of the magician Kropotkin the Great during one of his visits to Gamma Base. Even though he hasn't been to Gamma Base for a while, Kropotkin the Great still owns this Hulk Robot.

Second Hulk Robot
Rusty and Arthur are two Maryland Institute of Technology students who constructed a Hulk robot to be the mascot for their school's all-star game, but Dr. Timothy Ryan considered it dangerous and wouldn't allow it. It was brought to life by cosmic energies released by the Eternals from Olympia when they emerged from the Uni-Mind. The energies granted the Hulk Robot sentience and increased its strength to rival the Hulk. It broke out of the lab and went on a rampage. When the National Guard couldn't stop the Hulk Robot, three Eternals members (Ikaris, Makkari, and Sersi) were called in. Both the Eternals and National Guard were losing until Zuras entered the fray. When it charged Zuras, cosmic energies leaked and it was rendered inert.

Later on, Doctor Doom found the Hulk Robot and dismantled and rebuilt it to serve him. He sent it to fight the Thing who thought it was the real Hulk after taking out the Grey Hulk. When Thing discovered it wasn't the real Hulk during battle, he tore it apart.

During the Acts of Vengeance event, Doctor Doom gave Jester II the Hulk Robot's parts and Jester rebuilt it (with the addition of humorous weapons in its arsenal) as a member of the Assembly of Evil. During the Avengers' press conference, the Hulk Robot attacked She-Hulk and had her on the ropes until Wasp attacked the Jester's remote control causing the Hulk Robot to go haywire. She-Hulk destroyed it by flinging it into an energy blast fired by Fenris.

The Hulk Robot (or the non-operating version) was seen in a museum the Eternals kept in Olympia which held reminders of foes and their weapons. Zuras displayed the robot to Joey Eliot.

During the Fall of the Hulks storyline, the Hulk Robot returned. When Galactus created the Cosmos Automaton to serve him as part of a later retelling of the Hulk Robot's origin as shown on the extraterrestrial disk, he abandoned it during a visit to one of the worlds that he would consume causing it to seek a new form for its body. After influencing Professor Gregson Gilbert into creating Dragon Man and finding it not to be a suitable candidate, it then influenced Mad Thinker into creating a Hulk Robot. Even though he didn't know why he created, Mad Thinker had it locked away. After the extraterrestrial disk was done showing this to Red Hulk and A-Bomb, Red Hulk considered decapitating it only for the Hulk Robot to activate upon absorbing the cosmic energy that was used to empower Red Hulk. This was all part of Leader and MODOK's plan to siphon the energy. Bruce Banner, Red Hulk, and A-Bomb looked at the enemies that they were facing and found a holographic shot of the Hulk Robot. Leader (alongside the other Intelligencia members) managed to obtain the Hulk Robot. The Leader used it to attack former member Doctor Doom when Skaar attacks. Doctor Doom fell victim to the Hulk Robot's "Poison Pill" when Bruce Banner arrived. The Leader then had the Hulk Robot carry away Doctor Doom.

Hulk Robot later helped MODOK and the Mad Thinker's Gammadroid subdue Red Hulk.

Red Hulk later drains the Gamma Energy from the Hulk Robot and rips it apart.

Hulkling

Human Cannonball

Human Fly

Richard Deacon

Unnamed

Human Top

Bruce Bravelle
The Human Top (or just the Top) is a Golden Age superhero appearing in American comic books published by Marvel Comics. The character appeared in two stories published by Timely Comics (the predecessor of Marvel Comics) in 1940 and 1942, and not since then. His real name is Bruce Bravelle. He is called "the Human Top" in the story titles but just "the Top" within the body of the stories.

Bravelle appeared in a ten-page backstory ("The Origin of the Human Top") in the first (and only) edition of Red Raven Comics, cover-dated August 1940, with script and artwork by Dick Briefer.

Bravelle's second appearance was in the backstory "The Red Terror" in Tough Kid Squad, cover-dated March 1942.

Bruce Bravelle was a test subject for a scientist who was trying to find a way to nourish the human body with electrical currents instead of food. In the middle of one of the tests, a bolt of lightning struck the castle in which the experiment was being conducted, causing an opposing magnetic flow and giving Bravelle the ability to spin around at superhuman speed when he crosses his wrists or is exposed to electricity. He can fly, drill his way through walls, and deflect bullets. His bullet-deflecting and wall-drilling powers are created by the intense whirlwind which he generates when spinning.

In his first adventure (published in 1940), the Top thwarts a bank robbery and is accused of being a thief when the bank manager personally keeps the returned money, but ultimately exposes the manager.

In his second adventure (published in 1942), the Top fought and defeated a sinister criminal mastermind called the Red Terror. The Red Terror and his goons derail and rob a train and escape in a zeppelin. The Top tracks them to their hideout in an abandoned mine and kills them all as they attempt to escape.

David Cannon

David Mitchell

Human Torch

Jim Hammond

Johnny Storm

Humbug

Hummingbird

Humus Sapien

Amber Hunt

Amber Hunt is a pyrokinetic superhero in the Marvel Comics universe.

The character, created by Steve Gerber and R.R. Phipps, first appeared in Malibu Comics' Exiles #1 (August 1993).

Within the context of the stories, Hunt was an average American teenager in the Ultraverse before being exposed to the alien Theta Virus, which gave her super powers. Under the alias En Flame, she has been a team member of the Exiles and Ultraforce.

Huntara

Hunter
The Hunter (Nina Smith) is a minor character within Marvel Comics. The character, created by Fiona Avery and Mark Brooks, first appeared in Amazing Fantasy (vol. 2) #3 (October 2004). She is Anya Corazon's critically-insensitive rival and Miguel Legar's girlfriend. Nina is a member of the Spider Society / WebCorps who has fought the Sisterhood of the Wasp. Nina later becomes the true receptacle of Araña's exoskeleton, allowing her to be the Spider Society's Hunter.

Henrietta Hunter

Stevie Hunter

Hunter in Darkness
Hunter in Darkness is a semi-legendary, bipedal lupine creature native to the Canadian wilderness, first appearing in Wolverine (vol. 2) #34 (December 1990). This humanoid, wolf-like being is animalistic though somewhat intelligent, alternating between mindless aggression and calculated hunting behaviors, even at one point seemingly forming an "alliance" with Elsie-Dee, Albert, and Wolverine. Among the Blackfoot in Canada, the Hunter is known as a boogeyman and the subject of legends. Wolverine first encountered the creature in the Canadian wilderness after escaping from the Weapon X project in a mostly feral state, at which point Wolverine freed the Hunter from a bear trap. Wolverine reencountered the Hunter years later. The Hunter was at one point captured and put on display in New York City, but it later escaped and returned to Canada.

Hunter the White Wolf

Huntsman

Employee of Zeus

Weapon XII

Hurricane

Harry Kane

Makkari

Albert Potter

Dark Riders

Civil War

Husk

Faiza Hussain

Hussar

Hussar is a warrior serving in the Royal Elite of the Shi'ar Imperial Guard. She wields a whip that she uses to channel bioelectricity into her opponents to shock and paralyze. The character, created by Chris Claremont and John Byrne, first appeared in The Uncanny X-Men #137 (September 1980).

Hussar joined in the Imperial Guard's trial by combat with the X-Men to decide the fate of the Phoenix.

She became a traitor and part of a renegade Imperial Guard faction which served Lord Samedar, Deathbird, and the Brood in their conspiracy to overthrow Shi'ar Princess-Majestrix Lilandra Neramani. The renegades battled the X-Men and are defeated. Despite her crimes, Hussar is reinstated with the Guard.

When Deathbird became Empress, Astra commanded the entire Imperial Guard to fight the combined forces of the Starjammers and Excalibur on Earth so that she could claim the power of the Phoenix Force for herself. The Guardsman Zenith was killed, and the Guard were forced to retreat when Deathbird was put in danger. (Some time later War Skrulls impersonating Charles Xavier and the Starjammers deposed Deathbird and restored Lilandra to the throne. Deathbird ceded the empire back to Lilandra as she had grown bored of the bureaucracy.)

Alongside the Avengers and the Imperial Guard, Hussar battled the Kree Starforce on Chandilar during the Kree/Shi'ar war. In the battle, Hussar teamed with the Living Lightning to defeat Supremor. Alongside the Imperial Guard, she then battled the Avengers on the Shi'ar throneworld of Chandilar and was this time defeated by the Living Lightning.

She, Warstar, Neutron, and Webwing were punished for their earlier treachery against Lilandra and sent to Earth, which had been turned into an intergalactic prison in the Maximum Security crossover in 2000. The four prisoners join up with the lone D'Bari survivor Starhammer, who plots revenge against Jean Grey for the crimes committed by Dark Phoenix.

Warstar, Hussar, and Neutron are later reinstated with the Guard; Webwing has not yet been seen again. Hussar was among the Imperial Guardsmen who attacked the Kree homeworld. During the assault, Hussar and Electron fought Ronan the Accuser, who was ultimately defeated by their teammate, Titan.

Hussar served in a number of other missions with the Imperial Guard, including "Realm of Kings" and the "Trial of Jean Grey."

Hussar in other media
Hussar appears in the X-Men: The Animated Series episodes "The Phoenix Saga" and "The Dark Phoenix Saga" alongside the rest of the Imperial Guard.

Hussar appears as a mini-boss in the video game Marvel: Ultimate Alliance, voiced by April Stewart. She is powerful and has a devastating whip attack. Hussar fights the heroes alongside Neutron on board a Shi'ar warship after helping Deathbird overthrow Lilandra Neramani. Hussar was the one that told the heroes that half the Imperial Guard were fools to not see Deathbird's motive. In addition, she also mentions that an Imperial Guard member named Guardian is only loyal to the throne and not who sits in it. A simulation disk has Storm fighting Hussar at Arcade's Murderworld.

Hybrid

Jimmy Marks

Scott Washington

Hydro-Man

Hydron

Elemental

Salem's Seven member

Hyperion

Zhib-Ran

Mark Milton (Earth-712)

Supreme Power

Marcus Milton

Hyperstorm

Hyperstorm (Jonathan Richards) is a mutant supervillain from an alternate future. The character, created by Tom DeFalco, Paul Ryan, and Danny Bulanadi, first appeared in Fantastic Four #406 (November 1995). The son of his reality's Franklin Richards and Rachel Summers, he possesses psionic powers and the ability to manipulate reality. He conquers most of his reality and attempts to extend his rule to other timelines.

Hypno-Hustler

Hypnotia

References

Marvel Comics characters: H, List of